Taite Te Tomo (1871 or 1872 – 22 May 1939) was a Māori and Reform Party Member of Parliament in New Zealand.

Te Tomo was probably born in 1871 or 1872 near Ōtaki.

He won the Western Maori electorate in a 1930 by-election after the death of Māui Pōmare, but lost it in 1935 to the Ratana candidate Toko Ratana.

In 1935, he was awarded the King George V Silver Jubilee Medal.

He was a member of the Ngāti Tūwharetoa tribe, and of the Board of Ethnological Research. He died at Kākāriki Pā on 22 May 1939.

References

1870s births
1939 deaths
Reform Party (New Zealand) MPs
New Zealand MPs for Māori electorates
Members of the New Zealand House of Representatives
Unsuccessful candidates in the 1935 New Zealand general election
People from the Kapiti Coast District